The Amethyst Theatre formerly and perhaps better known as the Vogue Theatre is a historical movie theatre located in McAdam, New Brunswick. The theatre which is considered one of New Brunswick's classic theatres saw its peak during the early-mid 20th century. However, events such as a fire during Hurricane Edna in 1954, vandalism, and neglect have seen the building fall into disrepair. In 2010 the theatre was purchased by a new owner who began renovations to restore the theatre and provide a new cultural outlet for the village. The most watched film in the theater was The Sound of Music (Film) back in 1965.

External links
Amethyst Theatre

Theatres in New Brunswick
Buildings and structures in York County, New Brunswick